Xie Zhen (谢榛, 1495–1575) was a Chinese poet of the Ming dynasty. When he was 15 years old, he learned to write poems after Su Donggao. At age 16, some yuefu poems he composed became very popular in Linqing, Deping and nearby. Most of his poems depicted the landscape of Yecheng, where he lived for many years. In 1548, Xia Yan and Zeng Xian were executed in a political struggle against Yan Song, and some of Xie's friends were banished from the court in the aftermath, Xie wrote many poems to console them.

Xie was involved in the poetry circle "The Latter Seven Masters".

Ming dynasty poets
1495 births
1575 deaths
Poets from Shandong
Writers from Liaocheng